Ronny Scholze (born 17 September 1980) is a German former footballer who played as a forward. He played in the 2. Bundesliga with Dynamo Dresden.

References

External links
 
 
 

Living people
1980 births
German footballers
1. FC Magdeburg players
Borussia Neunkirchen players
Dynamo Dresden players
TSG Neustrelitz players
2. Bundesliga players
Regionalliga players
Oberliga (football) players
Association football forwards
1. FC Gera 03 players